UnityPoint Health Finley Hospital is a medical facility operating in Dubuque, Iowa.  The hospital is part of UnityPoint Health.  It is one of two hospitals operating in the city of Dubuque.  Finley is a 126-bed, non-profit hospital accredited by the Joint Commission on Accreditation of Healthcare Organizations and has been licensed by the state of Iowa.

In 2016, Finley Hospital opened a 70,000 square foot, 3-story addition located on the Grandview Avenue side of the current Finley Hospital building. The building houses the emergency department, surgical suites, and Heart and Vascular Center.

History 
The hospital was founded in 1890 when Mrs. Helen Finley bequeathed her estate towards the founding of a hospital in memory of her husband, Dr. John Finley. Dr. Finley was Dubuque's first general physician and the second permanent physician of both the county of Dubuque and the state of Iowa.  He and his wife were active within the Dubuque community, belonging to the early settlers group, helping to organize the Presbyterian Church, and forming the Northwest Medical Society (currently known as the Dubuque County Medical Society.)

Dr. Finley died before he could realize his dream of establishing a medical school and a hospital, so Helen Finley specified that her estate should be used to found a hospital in Dubuque named after her husband. The articles of incorporation for The Finley Hospital Company were adopted on February 21, 1890, and the Finley residence was transformed into a twenty-seven room hospital with 40 beds.

Accreditations 
UnityPoint Health Finley Hospital holds accreditation from The Joint Commission on Accreditation of Healthcare Organizations and is licensed by the State of Iowa. Finley Hospital has been designated as a Primary Stroke Center by The Joint Commission and the American Heart Association/American Stroke Association (AHA/ASA). The alliance was created to educate patients and to recognize hospitals that meet standards to improve outcomes for stroke care.

Finley Hospital is also certified by the Commission on Accreditation of Rehabilitation Facilities (CARF).

Finley Hospital's Sleep Center is the only sleep center in Dubuque to be accredited by the American Academy of Sleep Medicine (AASM).

References

External links 
 Finley Hospital Website

Hospitals established in 1890
1890 establishments in Iowa
Buildings and structures in Dubuque, Iowa
Economy of Dubuque, Iowa
Hospitals in Iowa
UnityPoint Health